Monosyntaxis bimaculata is a moth of the family Erebidae. It was described by Rob de Vos in 2009. It is found in New Guinea, where it has only been recorded from the Foja Mountains.

References

 

Lithosiina
Moths described in 2009